Juan José Sicre (born Juan José Sicre Velez; 1898 – 1974) was one of the greatest Cuban sculptors.  His most famous sculpture is of José Martí y Pérez (1958) (the José Martí Memorial) in the Plaza de la Revolución in Havana.

Sicre graduated from an art academy in Havana in 1919 and earned an art scholarship to go to Europe where he studied in Madrid at the Fine Arts School of San Fernando in and later under Antoine Bourdelle in Paris, returning to Cuba in 1927.

Sicre, along with Gattorno and the painter Victor Manuel introduced European modern art style to Havana, and began Cuba's Modern Art Movement.  He regularly contributed to the avant garde magazine, Revista de Avance, which helped to establish a Cuban national identity in the arts from 1927 to 1930.  Sicre became the professor of sculpture at the Academy of San Alejandro.

He is best known in Cuba for his huge monuments to José Martí, Simón Bolívar, and Victor Hugo, all located in Havana.  He also did statues of Eugenio María de Hostos in the Dominican Republic and of Alexandre Sabès Pétion and the Heroes of the Battle of Vertières in Haiti.  In the United States he has a bust of John F. Kennedy at the Inter-American Development Bank.  He also has in Washington, DC busts of Henry Clay, José Cecilio del Valle and Rubén Darío at the OAS Building. In Gainesville, Florida, there is a bronze head of Martí at the Center of Latin American Studies of the University of Florida. In Caracas, Venezuela, he produced a monument to Rómulo Gallegos.

He was married to Silvia D. Escoubet and their son, Jorge Sicre Escoubet, lived in Cleveland, Ohio and played with the orchestra and his grandson, Jorge Luis Sicre-Gattorno (1958- ), is an accomplished painter in the United States.

Footnotes

References
 DC memorials by Sicre

External links

Modern sculptors
1898 births
1974 deaths
Cuban expatriates in France
Cuban sculptors
Cuban expatriates in Spain
20th-century sculptors